Kampong Svay is a khum (commune) of Serei Saophoan Municipality in Banteay Meanchey Province in north-western Cambodia.

Villages

 Kampong Svay (កំពង់ស្វាយ)
 Kang Va (កាងវ៉ា)
 Phum Pir (ភូមិពីរ)
 Pongro (ពង្រ)
 Souphi (សុភី)
 Tarang Bal (តារាងបាល់)

References

Communes of Banteay Meanchey province
Serei Saophoan District